Grün (sometimes transliterated as gruen), is a German word and surname meaning "green".

People
 Anastasius Grün, pseudonym of Count Anton Alexander von Auersperg (1806–1876), Austrian poet and liberal politician
 Anselm Grün, German Benedictine friar, author of spiritual books, and clerical advisor
 Arno Gruen, German psychologist and psychoanalyst
 David Grün, birth name of politician David Ben-Gurion, Polish-Israeli first Prime Minister of Israel and Executive Head of the World Zionist Organization
 Derek Gruen, birth name of musician Del Marquis, the lead guitarist for the group Scissor Sisters
 Dick Grune, computer scientist
 Dietrich Gruen, founder of the Gruen Watch Company
 Eberhard Grün, German planetary scientist
 Erich S. Gruen, American classicist and ancient historian
 Fred Gruen, Australian economist, an early and influential voice in favour of free trade and tariff reductions in the 1960s and 1970s
 Frederick G. Gruen, son of Dietrich Gruen, player in Gruen Watch Company
 George J. Gruen, son of Dietrich Gruen, player in the Gruen Watch Company
 Georges Grün, a former football defender and a TV presenter for the UEFA Champions League matches at RTL TVI
 Jakob Grün (Hungarian: Grün Jakab; 1837–1916), an Austrian violinist of Hungarian origin
 John Jonas Gruen (1926–2016), American art critic, author, photographer, composer
 Jules-Alexandre Grün, French painter
 Karl Theodor Ferdinand Grün, German political theorist
 Stefan Grun, Australian rules football umpire in the AFL
 Victor Gruen (1903–1980), an Austrian-born commercial architect who emigrated to the United States in 1938 and is the father of the modern American shopping mall

Organizations
 Die Grünen, the name of several green parties:
 Alliance 90/The Greens (Bündnis 90/Die Grünen), a German party
 The Greens – The Green Alternative (Die Grünen – Die Grüne Alternative), an Austrian party
 Green Party of Switzerland (Grüne Partei der Schweiz)
 Gruen Watch Co., an American watch company

Recreation
 Gruene Hall, the oldest dance hall in Texas
 Grune, a character in the role-playing game Tales of Legendia

Other
 Fall Grün (Czechoslovakia), a pre-World War II German plan for an aggressive war against Czechoslovakia
 Gruen transfer, in shopping mall design, the moment when consumers respond to "scripted disorientation" cues in the environment
 Gruen (TV series), Australian TV program about advertising

See also
 Grin (disambiguation)

German-language surnames
Jewish surnames
Surnames from nicknames